Plestiodon coreensis, Smith's skink, is a species of lizard which is endemic to Korea.

References

coreensis
Reptiles described in 1937